Gnoma zonaria is a species of beetle in the family Cerambycidae. It was described by Carl Linnaeus in 1758, originally under the genus Cerambyx. It is known from Papua New Guinea and Moluccas.

Subspecies
 Gnoma zonaria albovaria Breuning, 1945
 Gnoma zonaria zonaria (Linnaeus, 1758)

References

Lamiini
Beetles described in 1758
Taxa named by Carl Linnaeus